Constantin Nicolaus Johannes Joachim Fest (born 1 July 1962) is a German politician (Alternative for Germany) and former journalist, who is serving as a Member of the European Parliament.

Life 
Fest was deputy editor-in-chief of Bild am Sonntag of Springer SE. In 2014 he wrote a comment in which he called Islam an "obstacle to integration". Colleagues distanced themselves, the press council issued a reprimand and Fest left Springer Verlag. In 2016 he joined the AfD Berlin and stated he wanted to join the Bundestag some day.

In 2019 he was elected as a member of the European Parliament.

Controversies 
After the death of the president of the European Parliament David Sassoli in 2022, Fest wrote: "Finally this bastard is gone" in a WhatsApp group of AfD MoP.

References

External links

Living people
MEPs for Germany 2019–2024
Alternative for Germany MEPs
1962 births